Skellefteå AIK is a Swedish professional ice hockey club from Skellefteå, Sweden. They currently play In the Swedish Hockey League. They play their home games in Skellefteå Kraft Arena, which seats 6,001 spectators. The team has won the Swedish Championship three times – in 1978, 2013, and 2014. They reached the SHL championship finals six years in a row between 2011–2016, tying Färjestad BK's streak between 2001–2006, winning two times.

History

Early years
Skellefteå AIK was founded on 1 July 1921 at på Café Norden in Skellefteå, although ice hockey was not played until 1943, with only training matches being played the first season. In the 1943–44 season, the club played in the local league Skellefteserien, which could not be finished due to unsuitable hockey weather as the games were played outdoors.

In 1955 Skellefteå qualified for the highest league in Sweden. Around this time the team was led by the so-called "Mosquito Line", which consisted of Anders "Akka" Andersson, "Garvis" Määttä and Kalle Hedlund. In the 1957–58 season they won the Allsvenskan's northern group and later finished second in SM-serien, only one point behind the winner Djurgårdens IF. Skellefteå AIK then played in Division 1 North until 1967. The club had difficulties qualifying for continued play in the Division 1 series but in 1975 the series was won and Skellefteå later finished in fourth place in SM-serien.

Elitserien
When the Swedish Elite League under the name Elitserien was formed in 1975, Skellefteå AIK was one of the teams participating.

In the 1977–78 regular season Martin Karlsson led the league in goals and points while Hardy Nilsson was the league's most penalized player. Skellefteå went on to win the playoffs led by a strong performance by Göran Lindblom (five goals and four assists in five games), becoming Swedish champions in 1978, and in 1981 Skellefteå won the regular season series.

In 1985, the club's hockey organization split from the mother club, and competed as Skellefteå HC until 1991, when the club would retake the Skellefteå AIK name.

Relegation
In 1990 Skellefteå was relegated but after 16 seasons of play in the Swedish second league (Allsvenskan). Skellefteå again qualified for the highest series and has played in Elitserien since 2006–07.

Return to the top tier
In their first year after promoting from the Swedish second league to Elitserien (now named the SHL), Skellefteå AIK became the best newcomer in Elitserien at that time with 73 points in 55 games. At one point during the 2007–08 season, Skellefteå led the league for the first time in 30 years. They also qualified for the playoffs for the first time since 1981 as the 8th seed. In the quarterfinals, Skellefteå were beaten by the eventual champions HV71 by 4–1 in games. At the end of the 2008–09 season, Skellefteå qualified for the playoffs again; in the quarterfinals, Skellefteå defeated Linköpings HC in 7 games, and in the series Skellefteå came back from a 1–3 deficit to win 4–3 in games. In game seven, Skellefteå won an overtime game that had gone to the 6th period (and thus had become the third longest playoff game in Elitserien history) with a goal by Kimmo Koskenkorva. In the semifinals, Skellefteå fell in four games to Färjestad BK who went on to win the Swedish Championship.

The following season, Skellefteå faced Färjestad in the playoffs once again, this time in the quarterfinals. Skellefteå won the series in seven games and went on to play HV71. HV won in five games on their way to become the 2010 champions.

Skellefteå had the three highest scoring players in the league in the 2010–11 season – Joakim Lindström, Mikko Lehtonen and David Rundblad. In the playoffs Skellefteå made it to the finals for the first time in 33 years, but were defeated in five games by Färjestad.

In the 2011–12 season, Skellefteå would return to the Swedish Championship Finals, where they lost to Brynäs IF in six games.

In the 2012–13 season, the team won the regular season. In the playoffs, Skellefteå once again reached the Finals, where they met their northernmost rival, Luleå HF. Skellefteå swept Luleå in four straight games 4–0 and clinched the Swedish Championship for the first time since 1978, and only the second time in club history. Skellefteå finished the playoffs with an impressive 12–1 record, and became the first team since 2003 to sweep their opponents in the Finals.

In the 2013–14 SHL season, Skellefteå once again won the regular season. In the playoffs, Skellefteå reached the Finals for the fourth year in a row, where they met Färjestad BK. Like in 2013, Skellefteå swept their opponents in the Finals in four straight games 4–0. Skellefteå clinched the Swedish Championship title for the third time in club history, and became the first team to defend the Swedish Championship title since Djurgårdens IF did so with their consecutive Swedish Championship titles in 2000 and 2001. Skellefteå AIK also became the first team since Brynäs IF in 1976–77 to win consecutive Swedish Championships by not losing a single game in both Finals series. Their 8–1 crush in game three marked the biggest goal margin (7 goals) in a single Finals game in SHL history.

In the 2014–15 SHL season, Skellefteå won their third consecutive regular season trophy. Doing so after having lost 14 players of top European class however, experts were impressed by the consistency of their managing, training and playing style. Going into the playoffs after their impressive regular season win, Skellefteå once again were huge favorites to win the le mat trophy. Although experts generally agreed that they were going to face a tougher challenge this year.

In the round of quarter finals Skellefteå once again had to face their opponent from the finals of 2012, Brynäs IF. Even though Skellefteå did sweep Brynäs in four consecutive quarterfinal games, some people started wondering if the dynasty of Skellefteå was over. Those wonderings mostly appeared due to the tightness and even scorelines of the quarter final games.

In the 2015 semifinals, Skellefteå for the third year in a row had to face Linköpings HC. Once again Skellefteå was going to prove the experts, who predicted a tight and tough series of games, wrong. With the round of semifinals ending 4–1 in favor to Skellefteå, they went into the finals as huge favorites.

The first game in the round of finals 2015 was played on 12 April between Skellefteå AIK and Växjö Lakers. The Lakers surprised most people when they "stole" Skellefteå's home game and won with two goals to one. The second game of the finals was by most media described as a "do or die game" for Skellefteå, arguing that a 2-0 lead for Växjö would be too difficult for Skellefteå to turn into a victory. Skellefteå AIK themselves however did not agree at all, but did emphasize the needs of improvement in the play around the nets. This was something they did manage to improve and it resulted in a clean sheet victory with three goals to nil. With the impressive 0–3 victory behind them, Skellefteå AIK was once again seen as the major favorites to win the le mat trophy.

Season-by-season record

Players and personnel

Current roster

Updated 26 February 2023

Team captains

 Göran Lindblom, 1982–85
 Thomas Hedin, 1985–88
 Martin Pettersson, 1988–91
 Tony Barthelsson, 1991–92
 Daniel Pettersson, 1993–98
 Pär Mikaelsson, 1998–05
 Magnus Wernblom, 2005–07
 Mikael Renberg, 2007–08
 Christoffer Norgren, 2008–10
 Fredrik Warg, 2010–11
 Jimmie Ericsson, 2011–14
 Erik Forssell, 2014–15
 Jimmie Ericsson, 2015–17
 Pontus Petterström, 2017–18
 Jimmie Ericsson, 2018–19
 Oscar Möller, 2019–present

Franchise records and leaders

Regular season
Most goals in a season: Magnus Wernblom, 37 (2005–06)
Most assists in a season: Bud Holloway, 51 (2012–13)
Most points in a season: Bud Holloway, 71 (2012–13)
Most penalty minutes in a season: Joakim Lindström, 134 (2010–11)
Most points in a season, defenseman: Johan Åkerman, 61 (2005–06)
Most shutouts in a season: Johan Backlund, 8 (2002–03)

Scoring leaders
These are the top-ten point-scorers of Skellefteå AIK in the SHL/Elitserien. Figures are updated after each completed season.

Note: Pos = Position; GP = Games Played; G = Goals; A = Assists; Pts = Points; P/G = Points per game;  = current  Skellefteå AIK player

Trophies and awards

Team
Le Mat Trophy
 1977–78
 2012–13
 2013–14

Individual
Guldpucken
  Hans Svedberg: 1957–58
  Anders Andersson: 1960–61, 1961–62
  Jimmie Ericsson: 2012–13

Guldhjälmen
  Bud Holloway: 2012–13
  Joakim Lindström: 2013–14

Peter Forsberg Trophy
  Jimmie Ericsson: 2012–13
  Joakim Lindström: 2013–14
Håkan Loob Trophy
  Martin Karlsson: 1977–78
  Mikko Lehtonen: 2010–11

Salming Trophy
  David Rundblad: 2010–11
  Tim Heed: 2014–15
  Niclas Burström: 2015–16

Stefan Liv Memorial Trophy
  Oscar Lindberg: 2013
  Joakim Lindström: 2014

Rinkens Riddare
  Anders Söderberg: 2006–07
  Oscar Möller: 2013–14

References

External links

 

Swedish Hockey League teams
Ice hockey teams in Sweden
Sport in Skellefteå
Ice hockey clubs established in 1921
1921 establishments in Sweden
Ice hockey teams in Västerbotten County